Nizam Peerwani is the chief medical examiner for Tarrant County, Texas. Locally, he is notable for his role in the David Koresh–Mount Carmel incident in Waco, Texas and in the trial of Chante Jawan Mallard for the murder of Gregory Glenn Biggs

Among his work includes the evaluation of genocide and human rights violations within Rwanda. He testified to the International Criminal Tribunal for Rwanda regarding the forensic team's findings. Peerwani was an advance team member in the evaluation of genocide within Bosnia-Herzegovina. Peerwani was honored in October 2006 by Physicians for Human Rights for his human rights work.

Peerwani is a graduate of the American University of Beirut (MD '76). He completed his residency in pathology at Baylor University Medical Center in Dallas, and is board certified in clinical, anatomic and forensic pathology.

References

External links 

 Okado, Bryon. "Honoring a Witness for the Dead". Fort Worth Star Telegram. October 19, 2006.
 Physicians for Human Rights: https://web.archive.org/web/20071012165426/http://physiciansforhumanrights.org/about/20-years/profiles/peerwani.html
 PBS: https://www.pbs.org/wgbh/pages/frontline/waco/drpeerwani.html

People from Tarrant County, Texas
Living people
Year of birth missing (living people)